The 1997 Race of Champions took place on December 7 at Gran Canaria. It was the 10th running of the event, and the 6th running at Gran Canaria. Carlos Sainz defeated sometime Subaru WRC teammate Colin McRae to become Champion of Champions.

Participants

Race of Champions

External links
Information sourced from https://web.archive.org/web/20101206015820/http://www.atodomotor.com/ccampeones/2000/palmares.htm

1997
1997 in motorsport
1997 in Spanish motorsport
December 1997 sports events in Europe
International sports competitions hosted by Spain
1997,Race of Champions